Bajrang Punia (born 26 February 1994) is an Indian freestyle wrestler, who competes in the 65-kg weight category. At the 2020 Tokyo Olympics, Punia won a bronze medal by defeating Kazakhstan's Daulet Niyazbekov with a 8-0 margin. Punia is the only Indian wrestler to win 4 medals at the World Wrestling Championships.

Early life and background 

Punia was born in Khudan, Jhajjar, Haryana, India. He began wrestling at the age of seven and was encouraged to pursue the sport by his father. Punia grew up in rural area. His family did not have money for traditional sports. Instead, he had to partake in free sports like Wrestling and Kabaddi. Punia's father was a wrestler as well and at a young age, his family enrolled him in a local mud wrestling school. Punia started to skip school to go to wrestling practice. He went to Chattarsal Stadium in 2008 where he was trained by Ramphal Mann. In 2015, his family moved to Sonepat so that he could attend a regional center of Sports Authority of India.

Currently, he works in the Indian Railways on the post of Gazetted officer OSD Sports. Punia enjoys seeking out knowledge of his village elders.

Punia is married to fellow wrestler Sangeeta Phogat.

Career

2013 Asian Wrestling Championships 
In New Delhi, India, in the semi-final bout, Bajrang lost 3-1 to Hwang Ryong-hak of North Korea to win the bronze medal in the men's freestyle 60 kg category.

In the Round of 16, he faced Shogo Maeda of Japan, beating him 3-1. His opponent in the quarter-finals was Morad Hassan of Iran whom he beat 3-1 to qualify for the semi-finals.

2013 World Wrestling Championships 
In Budapest, Hungary, Bajrang won the bronze medal in the men's freestyle 60 kg category by qualifying for the bronze medal bout through the repechage round. There, he met Enkhsaikhany Nyam-Ochir of Mongolia and beat him 9-2.

In the Round of 32, he faced Vladimir Dubov of Bulgaria who beat him 7-0. With the Bulgarian grappler qualifying for the final bout, Bajrang then faced Shogo Maeda of Japan and earned a walkover. His next opponent was Ivan Guidea of Romania, and with a 10-3 win over the Romanian, Bajrang earned a spot in the bronze medal bout.

2014 Commonwealth Games 
In Glasgow, Scotland, he won the silver medal in the men's freestyle 61 kg category, after losing 1-4 to David Tremblay of Canada.

In the Round of 16, Bajrang faced Sasha Madyarchyk of England and beat him 4-0. He faced Marno Plaatjies of South Africa in the quarter-finals and won 4-1. The Nigerian wrestler, Amas Daniel, was his opponent in the semi-finals and overcame him in a 3-1 score line.

2014 Asian Games 
In Incheon, South Korea, he won the silver medal in the Men's freestyle 61 kg category, after losing 1-3 to Masoud Esmaeilpoorjouybari of Iran.

In the Round of 16, he faced Tuvshintulga Tumenbileg of Mongolia and beat him 3-1. His quarter-finals opponent was Farkhodi Usmonzoda of Tajikistan whom he beat 4-1 to qualify for the semi-finals. He was assured of a medal when he beat Noriyuki Takatsuka of Japan 4-1 in the semi-finals.

2014 Asian Wrestling Championships 
In Astana, Kazakhstan, Bajrang won the silver medal in the men's freestyle 61 kg category, losing 0-4 to Masoud Esmaeilpour of Iran.

In the Round of 16, Bajrang met Lee Seung-Chul of South Korea whom he beat 3-1. In the quarter-finals, he faced Noriyuki Takatsuka of Japan whom he beat 3-1 to qualify for the semi-finals. There he met Nazmandakh Lhamgarmaa of Mongolia whom he beat 3-1 to assure himself of a medal.

2015 World Wrestling Championships 
Unlike his fellow Narsingh Yadav, Bajrang wasn't able to win a medal at the tournament in Las Vegas and finished 5th.

In the Round of 32, he met Batboldyn Nomin of Mongolia who beat him 10-0. With the Mongolian qualifying for the final bout in the 61 kg category, Bajrang got a chance to contest in the Repêchage round. His first opponent in the repêchage round was Reece Humphrey of the USA whom he beat 6-0 easily. The second repêchage opponent was Beka Lomtadze from Georgia who put up a fight but was ultimately overcome 13-6 by the Indian. Unfortunately, he fell at the last hurdle, drawing the bronze medal bout 6-6 but his opponent Vasyl Shuptar of Ukraine, scoring the last point.

Asian Wrestling Championship 2017
In 2017 May, he won a gold medal at the Asian Wrestling Championship held in Delhi.

Pro Wrestling League 
Bajrang was the second acquisition of the JSW owned Bangalore franchise in the auction conducted in New Delhi. The wrestler was picked up for a sum of Rs 29.5 lakh.

The Pro Wrestling League was scheduled to be held from 10 December to 27 December across six cities.

2018 Commonwealth Games
In Gold Coast, Australia, he won the gold medal in the men's freestyle 65 kg category. He overcame Kane Charig of Wales by Technical Superiority to clinch the gold.

2018 Asian Games
On August 19, he won the Men's freestyle 65 kg /Gold medal. He defeated Japanese Wrestler Takatani Daichi 11-8; the score was locked at 6-6 after the first round.

2018 World Wrestling Championships 
Bajrang won Silver at the 2019 World Wrestling Championships. After that Silver Medal, he claimed World No. 1 in 65 kg category.

2019 World Wrestling Championships 
Bajrang won Bronze for the second time at a World Championship, thereby qualifying India for the Tokyo 2020 Olympics in the 65 kg freestyle wrestling event.

2020 Rome Ranking Series 

On 18 January, Bajrang defeated Jordan Oliver 4-3 in the final in the 65 kg freestyle category at the Ranking Series.

Matteo Pellicone Ranking Series 2021 
In 2021, he won the gold medal in the 65 kg event at the Matteo Pellicone Ranking Series 2021 held in Rome, Italy.

2021 Asian Wrestling Championships 
He clinched a silver medal at the 2021 Asian Wrestling Championships after losing to Takuto Otoguro in the final.

2020 Tokyo Olympics
On 6 August 2021, he won the pre-quarterfinal match in 65 kg category in 2020 Summer Olympics against Ernazar Akmataliev and his quarter-final match against Morteza Ghiasi Cheka.

In the bronze medal match he defeated the Kazakhstani wrestler Daulet Niyazbekov, winning by a margin of 8-0.

Bajrang and other Indian Olympians were featured in a can by the Indian soft drink manufacturer, Thums Up

2022 Commonwealth Games
Bajrang Punia clinched the gold medal with a dominating win over Canada’s Lachlan McNeil in the 65kg final bout at the 2022 Birmingham Commonwealth Games.

International competitions

World Championship

U23 World Championship

Asian Games

Commonwealth Games

Asian Wrestling Championship

Olympics

Record against opponents

Awards 

 Arjuna Award, 2015
Padma Shri Award, 2019
 Rajiv Gandhi Khel Ratna award, 2019
FICCI India Sports Award 2020

For winning the bronze medal at the 2020 Tokyo Summer Olympics
  from the Government of India.
  from the Government of Haryana.
  from the Board of Control for Cricket in India
 from the Indian Olympic Association

References

External links 
 FILA profile
 

Living people
Indian male sport wrestlers
1994 births
Sport wrestlers from Haryana
People from Jhajjar
Wrestlers at the 2014 Commonwealth Games
Wrestlers at the 2018 Commonwealth Games
Wrestlers at the 2022 Commonwealth Games
Wrestlers at the 2014 Asian Games
Asian Games medalists in wrestling
World Wrestling Championships medalists
Asian Games gold medalists for India
Asian Games silver medalists for India
Commonwealth Games gold medallists for India
Commonwealth Games silver medallists for India
Commonwealth Games medallists in wrestling
Medalists at the 2014 Asian Games
Wrestlers at the 2018 Asian Games
Medalists at the 2018 Asian Games
Recipients of the Padma Shri in sports
Recipients of the Khel Ratna Award
Recipients of the Arjuna Award
Asian Wrestling Championships medalists
Wrestlers at the 2020 Summer Olympics
Olympic wrestlers of India
Olympic bronze medalists for India
Medalists at the 2020 Summer Olympics
Olympic medalists in wrestling
Medallists at the 2018 Commonwealth Games
Medallists at the 2022 Commonwealth Games